Trailing North is a 1933 pre-Code American western drama film directed by John P. McCarthy. It was released in 1933 in the US by Monogram Pictures.

Cast 
Bob Steele as Lee Evans
Doris Hill as Mitzi
Arthur Rankin as Lucky
George Hayes as "Flash" Ryan
Norman Fensier as Chief
Fred Burns as Jim Powers
Frances Morris as the girl at the 1st Outpost

See also 
Bob Steele filmography

References

External links 

Films directed by John P. McCarthy
American drama films
1933 drama films
1933 films
American black-and-white films
1930s American films
American Western (genre) films
1933 Western (genre) films
1930s English-language films